The Alberta Medical Association (AMA) is a provincial affiliate of the Canadian Medical Association, established in 1889 in the Canadian province of Alberta. It describes itself as an "advocate for its physician members, providing leadership and support for their role in the provision of quality health care".

The Alberta Medical Association was formed in 1906, as the Canadian Medical Association, Alberta Division and serves as the College of Physicians and Surgeons of Alberta. It was predated by the North West Territories Medical Association founded in 1889 at a Canadian Medical Association meeting at Banff. The association supported prepaid health insurance in the 1940s, and its advocacy helped bring about the government-created Medical Services (Alberta) Incorporated. The group's name was formally changed to the Alberta Medical Association in the 1960s.

Mandate and mission
It describes itself as an "advocate for its physician members, providing leadership and support for their role in the provision of quality health care".

Affiliations
It is a provincial affiliate of the Canadian Medical Association, is a national, voluntary association of physicians that advocates on behalf of physicians and their patients on key health issues.

Background
At an 1889 Canadian Medical Association meeting held in Banff, Alberta the North West Territories Medical Association was founded.

In 1906, the Canadian Medical Association, Alberta Division was formed, as the College of Physicians and Surgeons of Alberta.

In the 1960s, the organization changed its name to the Alberta Medical Association (AMA).

References

Medical associations based in Canada
Medical and health organizations based in Alberta
Professional associations based in Alberta
1889 establishments in Alberta